Maracajaú (Tupi) is a community and beach located in the Brazilian city of Maxaranguape, state of Rio Grande do Norte (about 50 km from the state capital, Natal). With a population of approximately 2,000 people the main source of income is fishing followed by tourism.

Maracajaú is known for coral formations locally called "Parrachos de Maracajaú" located to 7 kilometers of the coast that form natural pools of crystalline waters.

On the beach water park is located Manoa Park.

External links
www.maracajau-rn.com.br

Populated coastal places in Rio Grande do Norte
Beaches of Brazil
Landforms of Rio Grande do Norte